William II of Henneberg-Schleusingen (born: 14 March 1415; died: 8 January 1444, killed in a hunting accident) was the second husband of Catherine of Hanau (born: 25 January 1408; died: 25 September 1460). She was the oldest daughter of Reinhard II, Count of Hanau and his wife Catherine of Nassau-Beilstein and had earlier been married to Count Thomas II of Rieneck. William II and Catherine were engaged on 17 May 1432.

Princely count William II died after a hunting accident, which happened on the evening of New Year's Day 1444: a wild boar, which he tried to kill with his sword, wounded him so severely that he died a few days later.

William and Catherine had the following children:

 William III, Princely count of Henneberg-Schleusingen (born: 12 March 1434; died: 26 May 1480), married to Duchess Margaret  of Brunswick-Wolfenbüttel (born: 1451, died: 13 February 1509)
 Margaret (1437-1491), a nun in the convent at Ilm
 John III (born: 2 July 1439; died: 20 May 1513), abbot of the monastery of Fulda
 Berthold XII (born: 9 January 1441), clergyman
 Berthold XIV (born: 4 March 1443; died: 20 April 1495), provost of Bamberg
 Margaret (born: 10 October 1444; died: 3 March 1485), married to Count Günther XXXVI of Schwarzburg-Blankenburg (d. 1503)

References 
 Georg Hanna: Katharina von Hanau, in: Mitteilungsblatt der Heimatstelle des Main-Kinzig-Kreises, vol. 14, 1989, p. 201–203
 W. Sattler: Das alte Schloß Mainberg bei Schweinfurt und seine Bewohner. Historische Skizze, new edition, 1854, p. 17 ff

Footnotes 

1415 births
1444 deaths
House of Henneberg
Counts of Henneberg
15th-century German people
Deaths due to boar attacks